The 1998 Rio 400 was the fifth round of the 1998 CART World Series Season, held on May 10, 1998, on the Autódromo Internacional Nelson Piquet, Rio de Janeiro, Brazil.

Qualifying

The Scottish driver Dario Franchitti, from Team Green set the pole.

Race
At the start, the Italian driver Alex Zanardi, from Chip Ganassi Racing took the lead. At lap 19, fellow Italian driver Max Papis, from Arciero-Wells Racing retired due to a broken engine. After 21 laps, the top six was: Alex Zanardi, Gil de Ferran, Dario Franchitti, Tony Kanaan, Christian Fittipaldi and Michael Andretti. At lap 30, Kanaan, from Tasman Motorsports, retired due to an engine fire, bringing out the first caution of the race. The lead lap cars went to pit stop at the same lap. Newman-Haas Racing driver Michael Andretti hit a tire in the pits, then he suffered a penalty. The restart came out at lap 37. A few laps later, Team Green driver Paul Tracy was hit by Gil de Ferran, from Walker Racing. 2nd caution. The restart was out at lap 47. Lap 54, the Mexican driver Michel Jourdain Jr., from Payton/Coyne Racing hit the wall, bringing out the third caution. The restart came out at lap 60. Michael Andretti did an overtaking show. He was one lap down in 24th. After some laps, he was in sixth.

With 65 laps to go, Zanardi, Bryan Herta, Adrian Fernández and Greg Moore did their pit stops during green flag. At that time, Fittipaldi, André Ribeiro and Hélio Castroneves were out of the race. Only two Brazilian drivers were in the race at that moment: Maurício Gugelmin and Gualter Salles. At lap 91, Salles retired due to a crash at turn one, bringing out the fourth caution. At the same lap, polesitter Dario Franchitti retired due an engine issue. The restart happened at lap 98. After this lap, Scott Pruett, from Patrick Racing, retired. Player's Forsythe Racing driver Patrick Carpentier, suffered a tire problem at lap 102, and retired. At lap 108, the top 10 was: Zanardi, Moore, Fernandez, Richie Hearn, Herta, Jimmy Vasser, Al Unser Jr., Andretti, Bobby Rahal and Mark Blundell. From lap 116-onwards, the battle for the win was between the Italian Alex Zanardi and the Canadian Greg Moore. At lap 120, Moore almost lost the control of his car, after he went sideways at turn four. With five laps to go, Moore did an amazing overtake manoeuvre on Zanardi, and took the lead. The German driver Arnd Meier, was in front of both. Moore won the race, his first win of the season, the third win of his Champ Car career.

Classification

Race

Caution flags

Lap Leaders

Point standings after race

References

Rio 400
Rio 400
Rio 200